The 2022 season was the 108th in Remo's existence. This season Remo participated in the Campeonato Brasileiro Série C, the Campeonato Paraense and the Copa do Brasil.

Remo finished the Campeonato Brasileiro Série C in the 12th place, missing out on the top eight places that would advance to the second stage and consequently failing to promotion to Série B of the following year. The club won the Campeonato Paraense by the 47th time. In the Copa do Brasil, Remo was eliminated in the third round by Cruzeiro.

Remo was also going to play in the Copa Verde, but gave up the competition.

Players

Squad information
Numbers in parentheses denote appearances as substitute.

Top scorers

Disciplinary record

Kit
Supplier: Volt Sport / Main sponsor: Banpará

Transfers

In

Out

Notes

Competitions

Campeonato Brasileiro Série C

First stage

Matches

Campeonato Paraense

Group stage

Matches

Final stage

Quarter-finals

Semi-finals

Finals

Copa do Brasil

Third round

References

External links
Official Site 
Remo 100% 

2022 season
Clube do Remo seasons
Brazilian football clubs 2022 season
2022 in Brazilian football